Río Verde Canton is a canton of Ecuador, located in the Esmeraldas Province.  Its capital is the town of Rioverde.  Its population at the 2001 census was 22,164.

Demographics
Ethnic groups as of the Ecuadorian census of 2010:
Afro-Ecuadorian  57.1%
Mestizo  34.4%
White  5.0%
Montubio  2.2%
Indigenous  1.3%
Other  0.2%

References

Cantons of Esmeraldas Province